Joséphine-Charlotte can refer to:

 Princess Joséphine-Charlotte of Belgium (1927-2005)
 Joséphine-Charlotte metro station, Brussels
 Grande-Duchesse Joséphine-Charlotte Concert Hall, Philharmonie Luxembourg